Devante McKain (born 26 June 1994) is an English footballer who plays for Bedford Town as a defender.

Club career
McKain began his youth career at Fulham before eventually moving on to Maidenhead United. In November 2012, McKain signed for Gillingham for an undisclosed fee. At the time, then Gillingham boss Martin Allen said "Devante was recommended to me by Maidenhead United manager Johnson Hippolyte, the same man that recommended DJ Campbell to me." Allen also said of McKain "He is big. He is strong. He is quick. He heads it. He needs to improve technically but he has got priceless attributes for a young centre-back." Also at the time, Maidenhead United manager Johnson Hippolyte said of McKain, "from day one we were all adamant he would play professional football. It was a no brainer, that's how much ability he has."

McKain made his Football League One debut for Gillingham on 27 April 2013 at Burton Albion. On 7 September 2013, he made his second Gillingham appearance against Crawley Town.

In October 2013, Martin Allen said, "Devante was close to playing in our team a couple of weeks ago. He has been fantastic in training."

In May 2014, McKain signed a new one-year deal to stay at Gillingham.

In March 2015, Devante was released by Gillingham along with several others

References

External links

Profile at Aylesbury United

1994 births
Living people
Footballers from Hammersmith
English footballers
Association football defenders
Gillingham F.C. players
Maidenhead United F.C. players
Bromley F.C. players
Hayes & Yeading United F.C. players
English Football League players
National League (English football) players